The Puerto Princesa Cathedral, also known as the Immaculate Conception Cathedral Parish, is a Roman Catholic cathedral in the city of Puerto Princesa, Palawan in western Philippines. It is in the Neo-Gothic architectural tradition and is the mother church of the Apostolic Vicariate of Puerto Princesa which covers the municipalities of Palawan west of Puerto Princesa City. It is located at the border of Barangay Matiyaga Poblacion and Liwanag Poblacion, near the Port of Puerto Princesa. At 118° east longitude, it is the westernmost cathedral in the country.

History
The first mass in Puerto Princesa, initially a barrio, was held at the site of the present cathedral on March 10, 1872 by the Augustinian Recollect Fray Ezequiél Moreno (now a saint), six days after the Spanish expedition arrived in the area. Subsequently, Moreno established the town and its parish mission under the patronage of the Immaculate Conception of the Virgin Mary.

 During World War II, on December 14, 1944, the parish witnessed the Palawan massacre at the adjacent Plaza Cuartel where more or less 150 American soldiers were burned by the Imperial Japanese forces.

The church has been rebuilt several times since its establishment, wherein the present structure took almost a century before it was completed in 1961 to serve as a cathedral of the then Palawan Apostolic Vicariate under the helm of Most Rev. Gregorio I. Espiga. The facade and interior are reminiscent of the architecture of churches in Medieval Europe.

On December 8, 2014, on the cathedral's patronal feast day, the NHCP unveiled a historical marker of Saint Ezequiél Moreno, underlining his contribution to the founding of the city. At present, the cathedral and the Rizal Park at its front, is usually included in the itinerary of city tour packages around Puerto Princesa, including, but not limited to Iwahig Prison and Penal Farm, Palawan Heritage Center, Palawan Butterfly Ecological Garden and Tribal Village, and Palawan Wildlife Rescue and Conservation Center (Crocodile Farm).

Gallery

References

External links
 Facebook page 

Buildings and structures in Puerto Princesa
Marked Historical Structures of the Philippines
Spanish Colonial architecture in the Philippines
Roman Catholic cathedrals in the Philippines
Gothic Revival church buildings in the Philippines
1872 establishments in the Spanish Empire
19th-century Roman Catholic church buildings in the Philippines
20th-century Roman Catholic church buildings in the Philippines